The Bacolod Metropolitan Area, simply known as Metro Bacolod, is the 8th-most populous and the 6th-most densely populated metropolitan area out of the 12 metropolitan areas in the Philippines. This metropolitan area as defined by the National Economic and Development Authority (NEDA) has an estimated population of 1,435,593 inhabitants as of the 2020 official census by the Philippine Statistics Authority.

The metropolitan area is centered on Bacolod, the provincial capital, and the component cities of Bago, La Carlota, Silay, Talisay and Victorias and municipalities are Enrique B. Magalona, Murcia, Pulupandan, San Enrique and Valladolid, all  composed of eleven capitals (6 Cities & 5 Municipalities) located in the province of Negros Occidental. As of 2005, Metro Bacolod has relatively high GDP shares, contributed ₱88,056,250 or about 7.3% of the country's gross domestic product (GDP). Metro Bacolod is among those identified by the National Framework for Physical Planning: 2001–2030 as one of the country’s industrial, financial and technological centers. It is ranked 4th among the six regions in terms of GDP contributions in 2005 and expanded. The Bacolod city government, the definition based on the 2020 official census of the Philippine Statistics Authority.

Cities and municipalities
All of the cities and municipalities of Metro Bacolod are located in the province of Negros Occidental.

Media
AM Stations
DYWB Bombo Radyo 630 (People's Broadcasting Service, Inc.)
DYEZ Aksyon Radyo 684 (Manila Broadcasting Company)
DYHB RMN 747 (Radio Mindanao Network)
DYRL Radyo Pilipino 1035 (Radyo Pilipino Corporation)
DZRH Nationwide 1080 (Pacific Broadcasting System) (Relay station of DZRH 666 in Manila)
DYAF Radyo Totoo 1143 (Catholic Bishops Conference of the Philippines) (Operated by the Diocese of Bacolod; a member of the Catholic Media Network)
1233 DYVS (Far East Broadcasting Company)
GMA Super Radyo DYSB 1341 (GMA Network, Inc.) (Relay station of DZBB 594 in Manila)
RPN DYKB Radyo Ronda 1404 (Radio Philippines Network)

FM Stations
90.3 XStream FM (Southern Broadcasting Network) (Operated by Yes2Health Advertising, Inc.)
91.1 FMR (Philippine Collective Media Corporation)
91.9 Love Radio (Manila Broadcasting Company) (Operated by Muñoz Broadcasting Concepts)
94.3 iFM (Radio Mindanao Network)
95.9 Star FM (People's Broadcasting Service, Inc.)
96.7 XFM (DCG Radio-TV Network) (Operated by Yes2Health Advertising, Inc.)
99.1 Q Radio (Mareco Broadcasting Network) (Relay station of DWBM 105.1 in Manila)
RJ 99.9 (Rajah Broadcasting Network) (Relay station of DZRJ 100.3 in Manila)
100.7 Radyo Negrense (Provincial Government of Negros Occidental)
102.3 Radyo5 True FM (Nation Broadcasting Corporation) (Relay station of DWFM 92.3 in Manila)
103.1 Brigada News FM (Baycomms Broadcasting Corporation)
103.9 Radyo Bandera Sweet FM (Fairwaves Broadcasting Network) (Operated by 5K Broadcasting Network, Inc.)
104.7 Muews Radio (Sagay Broadcasting Corporation)
105.5 Easy Rock (Cebu Broadcasting Company) (Operated by Muñoz Broadcasting Concepts)
K-Five 106.3 (Quest Broadcasting, Inc.) (Operated by 5K Broadcasting Network, Inc.)
Barangay FM 107.1 (GMA Network, Inc.)

TV Stations
RPN Channel 8 Bacolod
GMA Channel 13 & 30
Hope Channel Philippines TV-24
UNTV Channel 28
TV5 Channel 32
TV Natin Channel 34
BEAM Channel 36
GNN Channel 50

Cable & Satellite TV Providers
SkyCable - Bacolod
New Bacolod Cable TV - Bacolod
My Channel Cable Network - Bacolod, Pulupandan & Silay
Cignal TV
G Sat
Bago City Cable TV Network - Bago
Prime Cable Network - Murcia & Pulupandan
Negros Cable TV - Silay
Smile Cable TV - Talisay
Malihao Cable TV - Victorias
Vision Ventures Cable TV - La Carlota

Transportation

Airport

Bacolod–Silay International Airport is located in Silay City. Metro Bacolod is approximately 1hr 13mins by air from Ninoy Aquino International Airport and approximately 30–45 minutes by air from Mactan–Cebu International Airport. Commercial Airlines serving the metropolitan area are Philippine Airlines, Cebu Pacific Air, PAL Express and Cebgo.

Roads

Bacolod has two main roads, Lacson Street to the north and Araneta Street to the south. The city has a good traffic plan lay-out and very seldom has traffic jams. The streets in the downtown area are one way, making Bacolod free from traffic congestion. Recently, Bacolod is experiencing an increase in traffic congestion due to an increase in number of vehicles and a perceived lack of implementation of traffic rules by the local government.

Seaports

Banago Wharf and BREDCO Port are the vessels entry point in Bacolod. It has daily access to Iloilo, with different shipping lines such as 2GO Travel(as relaunched in 2012), Weesam Express, Ocean Jet, Montenegro Lines, Jomalia Shipping and Tri Star megalink. There are also access routes to Puerto Princesa City via Iloilo City, Cagayan de Oro City, General Santos City, Zamboanga City, Cotabato City, Butuan via Cagayan de Oro route, Dipolog City Iligan City, Ozamiz City, and Surigao City via Cagayan de Oro route. As of 2012 SuperFerry and Negros Navigation was relaunched into 2GO Travel routes from Bacolod going Manila, Iloilo and Cagayan de Oro. Bacolod is 18–23 hours from the Port of Manila, 2–3 hours from Dumangas Port and 45 minutes- 1hr from the Port of Iloilo.

Gallery

Bacolod

Silay

Talisay

Proposed developments
Former Bacolod Mayor Monico Puentevella proposed the creation of Metro Bacolod Development Authority (MBDA) which is now supported by the Negros Occidental Governor Alfredo Marañon Jr. The cities of Bacolod, Talisay, Silay, Bago, and the municipality of Murcia will be the components of MBDA. Once approved, Metro Bacolod will have a total population of 1,058,203.

Metro Bacolod Chamber of Commerce and Industry (MBCCI) president Frank Carbon believes that turning Bacolod and surrounding places into a metropolitan area is an essential factor in progress. He envisions Metro Bacolod to be composed of Bacolod, Silay, Talisay and Bago cities, as well as Murcia and Salvador Benedicto towns. There is a need to create a master plan for Metro Bacolod and the Metro Bacolod Development Authority (MBDA) which will help this capital city and nearby areas achieve their long-term goals and boost their business sector, Carbon said.

This plan divides the cities and municipalities to the following industries:

 Bacolod: Capital city, metropolitan core and financial center
 Bago: Industrial center
 Murcia: Agro-tourism hub
 Silay City: Heritage and cultural hub
 Talisay City: Village city and sub-urban development
 Salvador Benedicto: Summer capital

See also
Metropolitan areas of the Philippines
National Economic and Development Authority

References

External links
Official Website of National Economic and Development Authority

 
Bacolod
Negros Island
Bacolod